Jasmine Lennard (born 26 July 1985) is a British model, actress, TV host and reality television star from Westminster, best known for modelling for Scott Henshall and Gossard underwear. 

She first came to public attention when appearing as a contestant on Make Me a Supermodel before appearing on Celebrity Big Brother 10 .

Early life 
Born in Westminster, Lennard is the daughter of Brian Lennard, who founded Sacha Shoes, and Bond actress Marilyn Galsworthy. Lennard has two sisters, Pandora (b. 1988) and Jessica (b. 1983), named by their mother after three of their father's mistresses: "a tribute to those who didn't make it".

Career
Lennard came to the public's attention in 2005 as a finalist in the reality TV talent search Make Me a Supermodel. She angered judge Rachel Hunter by saying "I suggest she throws out the truckload of make-up she uses and hires a personal trainer." and talked about her lesbian affairs while filming the show. 

In 2005 she appeared in the reality TV show Trust Me – I'm A Holiday Rep. She has later pursued her acting and TV presenting career with a role in the 2005 film Revolver.

In 2006, Lennard appeared as a contestant on a celebrity edition of The Weakest Link, and as a talking head on various celebrity based documentaries. Later in the same year she was made presenter of Five Life spin-off show Make Me A Supermodel Extra. 

On 15 August 2012, she was the 12th housemate to enter Celebrity Big Brother 10. She was subsequently nominated for eviction and, on Day 8, was the first celebrity to be voted out of the house. She returned to the house on Day 11 as a guest.

Lennard appeared on a celebrity special of Come Dine with Me in December 2012 with Nick Pickard, Crissy Rock, Chelsee Healey and Marcus Collins - she was kicked off the show after allegedly threatening another guest during a confrontation and was replaced by Margi Clarke.

Lennard returned to Big Brother for the sixteenth series, taking part in Big Brother's Hotel from Hell task, where ex-housemates from the celebrity and civilian series would be staying in the Big Brother house for a brief period of time.

Personal life 
In 2007, Lennard moved to Los Angeles. In 2010, she gave birth at the Chelsea and Westminster Hospital in London to a son, Phoenix.

References

External links
 

1985 births
British female models
Living people
People from Belgravia